Roger Bofferding (born 17 February 1934) is a Luxembourgian sprinter. He competed in the men's 200 metres at the 1960 Summer Olympics.

References

External links
 

1934 births
Living people
Athletes (track and field) at the 1960 Summer Olympics
Luxembourgian male sprinters
Olympic athletes of Luxembourg
Place of birth missing (living people)